Ju Ju Wilson (born at Mantinea Flats, northern part of Western Australia) is an Aboriginal artist and part of the contemporary Indigenous Australian art movement. Besides being a prolific painter, tour guide, much sought-after cultural advisor, she is also an expert in bush tucker and medicines, author of booklets (on these subjects), didgeridoo maker and player, authority on Aboriginal sacred sites and rock art.

She is frequently invited to make appearances on television shows to talk about her art and abilities, such as her 2008 appearance on Ray Mears Goes Walkabout on BBC Two.

Personal life
Mother of six, Ju Ju comes from the Miriwung-Gajerrong group of the Kimberley region and was educated at Beagle Bay. Four generations of her family are artists (her maternal grandmother, her mother and her daughter are also very talented aboriginal artists).

Her Miriwoong name is Burriwee and she can speak five Aboriginal languages fluently.

References

External links
Ju Ju Wilson's profile and art

Living people
Australian Aboriginal artists
People from the Kimberley (Western Australia)
Australian women painters
21st-century Australian women artists
21st-century Australian artists
Year of birth missing (living people)